Roman Geszlecht (born 28 December 1961) is a Polish footballer. He played in four matches for the Poland national football team in 1981.

References

External links
 

1961 births
Living people
Polish footballers
Poland international footballers
Association football defenders
Sportspeople from Chorzów